Maja Schmid  (born 11 September 1967) is a Swiss freestyle skier. She competed at the 1994 Winter Olympics in Lillehammer, where she placed fourth in women's aerials. She won a gold medal in women's combined at the FIS Freestyle World Ski Championships 1991.

References

External links 
 

1967 births
Living people
Swiss female freestyle skiers
Olympic freestyle skiers of Switzerland
Freestyle skiers at the 1994 Winter Olympics
20th-century Swiss women